Fredensborg Kommune is a municipality (Danish, kommune) in Region Hovedstaden (Capital Region). The municipality covers an area of 112.13 km2 and has a total population of 41,211 (as of 1. January 2022). Its mayor, since 2010, is Thomas Lykke Pedersen, a member of the Social Democrats (Socialdemokraterne) political party.

The municipality was created on 1 January 2007, in a merger of the former municipalities of Karlebo Kommune and Fredensborg-Humlebæk Kommune.

Fredensborg Palace is the Danish Royal Family’s spring and autumn residence. Queen Ingrid of Denmark and Prince Consort Henrik died there.

Locations

Politics

Municipal council
Fredensborg's municipal council consists of 27 members, elected every four years.

Below are the municipal councils elected since the Municipal Reform of 2007.

Attractions 
The best known attraction in the municipality is the Louisiana Museum of Modern Art.

Twin towns – sister cities

Fredensborg is twinned with:
 Bad Berleburg, Germany
 Håbo, Sweden
 Ingå, Finland
 Nittedal, Norway
 Paide, Estonia
 Sudbury, England, United Kingdom

References 

 Municipal statistics: NetBorger Kommunefakta, delivered from KMD  Kommunedata (Municipal Data)
 Municipal mergers and neighbors: Eniro new municipalities map

External links

Official website

 
Municipalities in the Capital Region of Denmark
Municipalities of Denmark
Populated places established in 2007